KDHW-CD is a low-power digital Class A television station serving Yakima, Washington. Affiliated with the Trinity Broadcasting Network, the station is owned by Christian Broadcasting of Yakima, and broadcasts over channel 45. It airs on cable 10 in Yakima, and cable 39 in Ellensburg.

Their programming includes local gospel show The Rock, God's Next Generation, and Good News in the Valley, a news magazine program.

Digital programming
KDHW-CD channel 35 is multiplexed. Through PSIP, it redirects to channel 45.

Translator

External links
 Christian Broadcasting of Yakima
 

DHW-CD
Trinity Broadcasting Network affiliates
Television channels and stations established in 1979
Low-power television stations in the United States
1979 establishments in Washington (state)